Girardinia diversifolia, commonly known as the Himalayan nettle or Nilghiri nettle, is a plant species native to Nepal and in the Himalayan parts of India such as Uttarakhand, Himachal Pradesh and Jammu and Kashmir and in vast parts of China.
It is a shade tolerant, tall, stout and erect herb growing up to 3m height with perennial rootstock. The plant grows as a clump, and each clump has many stems. The stem contains bast fiber of unique quality which is strong, smooth and light.

Description
It is a 1.5 to 3 metres tall perennial herbaceous shrub that grows without cultivation all over Nepal. It most frequently occurs in the hilly and mountainous regions at altitudes up to 3000 m.

Vernacular names
The plant is locally known as:
  Sisaun in Kumauni language
 Kandaali in Garhwali language
 'Nepalese allo
 "Kungs" in Kullu district of Himachal Pradesh
 "Thurche" in Badugu language in the Nilgiris district

Uses

Traditional users of Allo are ethnic groups from across Nepal, including the Kulung, Gurung, Magar, Rai and Tamang people. Allo products are culturally important to both the Gurung and the Rai. It is also sold for commercial and non-religious purposes. Non-fibre uses of the plant range from fodder and fuel wood, to use as a live fence and in traditional medicines. Allo fibre is very flexible and has high tenacity, allowing it to be used in a multitude of applications ranging from clothing and bags to floor mats and rope. Fibres made from allo are fully biodegradable.

Gallery

References

Flora of Nepal
Urticaceae